My Show is an album by the Swedish singer Carola Häggkvist.  It was released on 19 November 2001 in Sweden and Norway. On the album charts, the album peaked at number 6 in Sweden.

Track listing
"My Show" (L Peirone / J Schella / A Barrén) 
"The Light" (M Håkansson / P Engborg) 
"I'm Coming Home" (Carola / H Andersson / M Ankelius) 
"I Believe In Love" (Carola / H Andersson / M Ankelius / A-L Högdahl) 
"The Pearl" (P Börjesson / K Johansson) 
"My Love" (D French / J McKenzie) 
"A Kiss Goodbye" (Carola / H Andersson / M Ankelius / A-L Högdahl) 
"Secret Love" (J Henriksen / J Lysdahl) 
"You + Me" (N Frisk / A Mattson) 
"Wherever You Go" (Carola / P Frisk) 
"Faith, Hope & Love" (Carola / D Eriksen) 
"If I Told You" (Carola / J Poppo / M Deputato) 
"Angel of Mercy" (B Gibb / R Gibb / M Gibb) 
"Someday" (B Bacharach / Tonio K)

Singles

The Light
"The Light" (Radio Edit)
"The Light" (Album Version)

I Believe In Love
"I Believe In Love" (Radio Hitvision Remix)
"I believe In Love" (Club Anthem Radio Mix)

 Sweden # 13 (1)

You + Me
"You + Me"

Charts

References

2001 albums
Carola Häggkvist albums